Carbonara is an Italian pasta dish.

Carbonara  may also refer to:

Places 
Carbonara di Bari, a comune (municipality) in the Italian region Apulia 
Carbonara di Nola, a comune in the Province of Naples in the Italian region Campania
Carbonara di Po, a comune in the Province of Mantua in the Italian region Lombardy
Carbonara Scrivia, a comune in the Province of Alessandria in the Italian region Piedmont
Carbonara al Ticino, a comune in the Province of Pavia in the Italian region Lombardy
 Pizzo Carbonara, the highest peak of the Madonie mountains in Sicily
 San Giovanni a Carbonara, a church in Naples, southern Italy
 Karbunarë, a village in Fier County, Albania
 Karbunarë, Vlorë, a village in Vlorë County, Albania
 Cape Carbonara, a promontory in Sardinia, Italy

Other uses 
 Carbonara, a female member of the Carbonari secret society
 "Carbonara", a 1982 song by Spliff
 La Carbonara (film 2000), an Italian film directed by Luigi Magni

People with the name 
 David Carbonara, a film and TV composer and music editor
 Gerard Carbonara (1886–1959), an American composer

See also
 Carbonera (disambiguation)
 Carbonaria (disambiguation)